The Aleutian Islands campaign was a military campaign conducted by the United States, Canada, and Japan in the Aleutian Islands, part of the Territory of Alaska, in the American Theater and the Pacific Theater of World War II starting on June 3, 1942. In the only two invasions of the United States during the war of a U.S. incorporated territory, a small Japanese force occupied the islands of Attu and Kiska, where the remoteness of the islands and the challenges of weather and terrain delayed a larger American-Canadian force sent to eject them for nearly a year. Successful Japanese invasions of other U.S. territories, which were unincorporated territories, in the western Pacific shortly after the Attack on Pearl Harbor included Wake Island, Guam, and the Philippines. The islands' strategic value was their ability to control Pacific transportation routes as US General Billy Mitchell stated to the U.S. Congress in 1935, "I believe that in the future, whoever holds Alaska will hold the world. I think it is the most important strategic place in the world."

The Japanese reasoned that their control of the Aleutians would prevent a possible joining of forces by the Americans and the Soviets and future attack on Japan proper via the Kuril Islands. Similarly, the US feared that the islands could be used as bases from which to carry out a full-scale aerial attack on US West Coast cities such as Anchorage, Seattle, San Francisco, or Los Angeles.

A battle to reclaim Attu was launched on May 11, 1943 and completed after a final Japanese banzai charge on May 29. On August 15, 1943, an invasion force landed on Kiska in the wake of a sustained three-week barrage, only to discover that the Japanese had withdrawn from the island on July 29.

The campaign is known as the "Forgotten Battle" because it has been overshadowed by other events in the war.

Many military historians believe that the Japanese invasion of the Aleutians was a diversionary or feint attack during the Battle of Midway that was meant to draw out the US Pacific Fleet from Midway Atoll, as it was launched simultaneously under the same commander, Isoroku Yamamoto. Some historians have argued against that interpretation and believe that the Japanese invaded the Aleutians to protect their northern flank and did not intend it as a diversion.

Japanese attack

Before Japan entered World War II, the Imperial Japanese Navy had gathered extensive information about the Aleutians but had no up-to-date information regarding military developments on the islands. Admiral Isoroku Yamamoto provided the Japanese Northern Area Fleet, commanded by Vice-Admiral Boshiro Hosogaya, with a force of two non-fleet aircraft carriers, five cruisers, twelve destroyers, six submarines, and four troop transports, along with supporting auxiliary ships. With that force, Hosogaya was first to launch an air attack against Dutch Harbor, then follow with an amphibious attack upon the island of Adak,  to the west. Hosogaya was instructed to destroy whatever American forces and facilities were found on Adak, but the Japanese did not know the island was undefended.

Because the US Naval Intelligence had broken the Japanese naval codes, Admiral Chester Nimitz had learned by May 21 of Yamamoto's plans, including the Aleutian invasion, the strength of both Yamamoto's and Hosogaya's fleets, and Hosogaya's plan to start the fight on June 1 or shortly thereafter.

Army strength, less air force personnel, at those three bases totaled no more than 2,300, composed mainly of infantry, field and antiaircraft artillery troops, and a large construction engineer contingent, which was used in the construction of bases. The Army Air Force's Eleventh Air Force consisted of 10 B-17 Flying Fortress heavy bombers and 34 B-18 Bolo medium bombers at Elmendorf Airfield, and 95 P-40 Warhawk fighters divided between Fort Randall AAF at Cold Bay and Fort Glenn AAF on Umnak. The naval commander was Rear Admiral Robert A. Theobald, commanding Task Force 8 afloat, who as Commander North Pacific Force (ComNorPac) reported to Admiral Nimitz in Hawaii. Task Force 8 consisted of five cruisers, thirteen destroyers, three tankers, six submarines, as well as naval aviation elements of Fleet Air Wing Four.

When the first signs of a possible Japanese attack on the Aleutians were known, the Eleventh Air Force was ordered to send out reconnaissance aircraft to locate the Japanese fleet reported heading toward Dutch Harbor and attack it with bombers, concentrating on sinking Hosogaya's two aircraft carriers. Once the enemy planes were removed, Naval Task Force 8 would engage the enemy fleet and destroy it. Eleventh Air Force was placed on full alert. Shortly thereafter bad weather set in, and no further sightings of the fleet were made that day.

Before the attack on Dutch Harbor, the Army's 4th Infantry Regiment, under command of Percy E. LeStourgeon, was established at Fort Richardson.  Col. LeStourgeon had previously designed a layout of base facilities—such as isolation of weapons and munitions depots—to protect against enemy attack.

Attack on Dutch Harbor

Making use of weather cover, the Japanese made a two-day aerial bombing of the continental United States for the first time in history on Dutch Harbor in the city of Unalaska, Alaska on June 3, 1942. However, only half of the striking force reached their objective. The rest either became lost in the fog and darkness and crashed into the sea or returned to their carriers. Seventeen Japanese planes found the naval base, the first arriving at 05:45. As the Japanese pilots looked for targets to engage, they came under intense anti-aircraft fire and soon found themselves confronted by Eleventh Air Force fighters sent from Fort Glenn Army Air Field on Umnak. Startled by the American response, the Japanese quickly released their bombs, made a cursory strafing run, and left to return to their carriers. As a result, they did little damage to the base.

On June 4, the Japanese returned to Dutch Harbor. This time, the Japanese pilots were better organized and prepared. When the attack ended that afternoon Dutch Harbor oil storage tanks were burning, the hospital partly demolished, and a beached barracks ship damaged. Although American pilots eventually located the Japanese carriers, attempts to sink the ships failed because of bad weather setting in that caused the US pilots to lose all contact with the Japanese fleet. However, the weather caused the Japanese to cancel plans to invade Adak with 1,200 men.

Invasion of Kiska and Attu
Main articles: Japanese occupation of Kiska and Japanese occupation of Attu

The Japanese invasions and occupations of Kiska on June 6 and Attu on June 7 1942 shocked the American public, as the continental United States was invaded for the first time in 130 years since 1815 (during the War of 1812). The invading forces initially met little resistance from the local Unangax, also known as Aleuts. Though the U.S. Navy had offered to evacuate Attu in May 1942, the Attuan Unangax chief declined. Little changed for the Unangax under Japanese occupation until September 1942 when Japan's Aleutian strategy shifted. It was at this point that the Unangax were taken to Hokkaido, Japan, and placed in an internment camp.

The invasion of Attu and imprisonment of the local Unangax became the justification for the United States' policy of forcible evacuation of the Unangax in the Aleutian Islands. Unangan civilians were placed in internment camps in the Alaska Panhandle.

Through the rest of the summer of 1942, aerial raids by either side could be flown only when the weather permitted. Japan installed a radar warning system on the islands and continued to resupply them, despite heavy disruptions against its shipping by US bombers and submarines. The establishment of American air bases in Umnak and Cold Bay would add to the threat faced by the Japanese.

Allied response

Many Americans feared that the Japanese would use the islands as bases to strike within range along the rest of the US West Coast. Although the West Coast was subject to attack several times in the past six months (including unrestricted submarine warfare in coastal waters, the bombardment of Ellwood in California and the bombardment of Fort Stevens in Oregon), the Aleutians Islands Campaign of June 1942 was the first major operation by a foreign enemy in the American Theater. Lieutenant Paul Bishop of the 28th Bombardment Group once recalled that:

Lieutenant Bob Brocklehurst of the 18th Fighter Squadron also said that:

In August 1942, the Air Force established an airbase on Adak Island and began bombing Japanese positions on Kiska. Navy submarines and surface ships also began patrolling the area. Kiska Harbor was the main base for Japanese ships in the campaign and several were sunk there, some by warships but mostly in air raids. On 5 July, the submarine , under command of Lieutenant Commander Howard Gilmore, attacked three Japanese destroyers off Kiska. She sank one and heavily damaged the others, killing or wounding 200 Japanese sailors. Ten days later,  was attacked by three Japanese submarine chasers in Kiska Harbor, with two of the patrol craft sunk and one other damaged.

Komandorski Islands

A cruiser and destroyer force under Rear Admiral Charles "Soc" McMorris was assigned to eliminate the Japanese supply convoys. They met the Japanese fleet in the naval Battle of the Komandorski Islands in March 1943. One American cruiser and two destroyers were damaged, and seven US sailors were killed. Two Japanese cruisers were damaged, with 14 men killed and 26 wounded. Japan thereafter abandoned all attempts to resupply the Aleutian garrisons by surface vessels, and only submarines would be used.

Attu Island

On 11 May 1943, American forces commenced an operation to recapture Attu ("Operation Landcrab"). The invasion force included the 17th and 32nd Infantry regiments of the 7th Infantry Division and a platoon of scouts recruited from Alaska, nicknamed Castner's Cutthroats. A shortage of landing craft, unsuitable beaches, and equipment that failed to operate in the appalling weather made it difficult for the Americans to exert force against the Japanese.

Adding to problems for the US forces, soldiers suffered from frostbite because essential cold-weather supplies could not be landed, and soldiers could not be relocated to where they were needed because vehicles could not operate on the tundra. The Japanese defensive strategy against the American attacks included Colonel Yasuyo Yamasaki having his forces engage the Americans not where they landed, as might have been expected, but the Japanese digging into the high ground far from the shore. That resulted in fierce combat, with a total of 3,829 U.S. casualties. Total casualties: 549 men were killed, 1,148 were wounded, with another 1,200 men suffering severe injuries from the cold weather. Also, 614 Americans died from disease, and 318 from miscellaneous causes, mainly Japanese booby traps or friendly fire.

On May 29, 1943, without warning the remainder of Japanese forces attacked near Massacre Bay. That was recorded as one of the largest banzai charges of the Pacific campaign. Led again by Colonel Yamasaki, the attack penetrated so deep into US lines that Japanese soldiers encountered rear-echelon units of the Americans. After furious, brutal, often hand-to-hand combat, the Japanese force was virtually exterminated. Only 28 Japanese soldiers were taken prisoner, none of them were officers. American burial teams counted 2,351 Japanese dead, but it was thought that hundreds of more Japanese bodies had been buried by bombardment during the battle.

Kiska Island

On 15 August 1943, an invasion force of 34,426 Canadian and American troops landed on Kiska. Castner's Cutthroats were part of the force, but the invasion consisted mainly of units from the U.S. 7th Infantry Division. The force also included about 5,300 Canadians, mostly from the 13th Canadian Infantry Brigade of the 6th Canadian Infantry Division, and the 1st Special Service Force, a 2,000-strong Canadian-American commando unit formed in 1942 in Montana and trained in winter warfare techniques. The Force included three 600-man regiments: the 1st was to go ashore in the first wave at Kiska Harbor, the 2nd was to be held in reserve to parachute where needed, and the 3rd was to land on the north side of Kiska on the second day of the assault.
The 87th Regiment of the 10th Mountain Division, the only major U.S. force specifically trained for mountain warfare, was also part of the operation.

Royal Canadian Air Force No. 111 and No. 14 Squadrons saw active service in the Aleutian skies and scored at least one aerial kill on a Japanese aircraft. Additionally, three Canadian armed merchant cruisers and two corvettes served in the Aleutian campaign but did not encounter enemy forces.

The invaders landed to find the island abandoned; the Japanese forces had left two weeks earlier. Under the cover of fog, the Japanese had successfully removed their troops on 28 July. Despite US military command having access to Japanese ciphers and having decoded all the Japanese naval messages, the Army Air Forces chose to bomb abandoned positions for almost three weeks. The day before the withdrawal, the US Navy fought an inconclusive and possibly meaningless Battle of the Pips  to the west.

Although the Japanese troops had gone, Allied casualties on Kiska numbered 313. They were the result of friendly fire, booby traps, disease, mines, timed bombs set by the Japanese, vehicle accidents, or frostbite. Like Attu, Kiska offered an extremely hostile environment.

Aftermath

Although plans were drawn up for attacking northern Japan, they were not executed. Over 1,500 sorties were flown against the Kuriles before the end of the war, including the Japanese base of Paramushir, which diverted 500 Japanese planes and 41,000 ground troops.

The battle also marked the first time that Canadian conscripts were sent to a combat zone in World War II. The government had pledged not to send draftees "overseas", which it defined as being outside North America. The Aleutians were considered to be North American soil, which enabled the Canadian government to deploy conscripts without breaking its pledge. There were cases of desertion before the brigade sailed for the Aleutians. In late 1944, the government changed its policy on draftees and sent 16,000 conscripts to Europe to take part in the fighting.

The battle also marked the first combat deployment of the 1st Special Service Force, but it also did not see any action.

In the summer of 1942, the Americans recovered the Akutan Zero, an almost-intact Mitsubishi A6M2 Zero fighter, which enabled the Americans to test-fly the Zero and contributed to improved fighter tactics later in the war.

Killed in action
During the campaign, two cemeteries were established on Attu to bury those killed in action: Little Falls Cemetery, located at the foot of Gilbert Ridge, and Holtz Bay Cemetery, which held the graves of Northern Landing Forces. After the war, the tundra began to take back the cemeteries and so in 1946, all American remains were relocated as directed by the soldier's family or to Fort Richardson near Anchorage, Alaska. On May 30, 1946, a Memorial Day address was given by Captain Adair with a 21-gun salute and the sounding of Taps. The Decoration of Graves was performed by Chaplains Meaney and Insko.

Veterans
The 2006 documentary film Red White Black & Blue features two veterans of the Attu Island campaign, Bill Jones and Andy Petrus. It is directed by Tom Putnam and debuted at the 2006 Locarno International Film Festival in Locarno, Switzerland, on August 4, 2006.

Dashiell Hammett spent most of World War II as an Army sergeant in the Aleutian Islands, where he edited an Army newspaper. He came out of the war suffering from emphysema. As a corporal in 1943, he co-authored The Battle of the Aleutians with Cpl. Robert Colodny under the direction of Infantry Intelligence Officer Major Henry W. Hall.

Legacy
Many of the United States locations involved in the campaign, either directly or indirectly, have been listed on the National Register of Historic Places, and several have been designated National Historic Landmarks.  The battlefield on Attu and the Japanese occupation site on Kiska are both National Historic Landmarks and are included in the Aleutian Islands World War II National Monument.  Surviving elements of the military bases at Adak, Umnak, and Dutch Harbor are National Historic Landmarks.  The shipwrecked SS Northwestern, badly damaged during the attack on Dutch Harbor, is listed on the National Register, as is a crash-landed B-24D Liberator on Atka Island.

See also
Aleut Restitution Act of 1988
American Theater (World War II)
Castner's Cutthroats
Japanese occupation of Attu
Japanese occupation of Kiska
Military history of the Aleutian Islands
Organization of the Imperial Japanese Navy Alaskan Strike Group
Paul Nobuo Tatsuguchi, Japanese doctor stationed on Attu
Report from the Aleutians, a 1943 American documentary propaganda film about the campaign, directed by John Huston

References

Notes

Bibliography

Further reading
 Vidal, Gore (1946), Williwaw, New York: E. P. Dutton.

External links

Logistics Problems on Attu by Robert E. Burks.
 
Aleutian Islands Chronology
Aleutian Islands War
Red White Black & Blue – feature documentary about The Battle of Attu in the Aleutians during World War II
PBS Independent Lens presentation of Red White Black & Blue – The Making Of and other resources
”Attu: North American Battleground of World War II”, a National Park Service Teaching with Historic Places (TwHP) lesson plan
Animated Maps of the Aleutians Campaign 
Attu, Aleutian Islands, Alaska WW-II KIA
US losses at Kiska

Aleutian Islands campaign
1942 in Alaska
1943 in Alaska
Aleutian Islands
American Theater of World War II
Campaigns of World War II
Invasions of the United States
History of Alaska
History of the West Coast of the United States
World War II sites in the United States
Battles and operations of World War II involving Canada
Naval battles of World War II involving Canada
Aerial operations and battles of World War II involving Canada